Alto Linus (born 25 September 1986) is a former Malaysian footballer who plays as a midfielder and forward. A versatile player, Alto has played in multiple positions, including on the wing and full-back. He notably played more than 200 matches for Sabah in the Malaysian League and holds the all-time record for most appearances for Sabah in the Malaysia Super League, playing 72 games between 2011-2012 and 2020-2022.

Playing career

Early career
Alto played for an amateur team Keningau/Pedalaman FC in the SAFA Sabah League. He played as forward.

Sabah FA
Alto joined Sabah in 2010. He scored 4 goals for Sabah in his first season as Sabah were promoted to the 2011 Malaysia Super League.

T-Team
In 2014, he joined Kuala Terengganu based club T-Team but have a lack of playing time and demoted into T-Team President's Cup squad.

Return To Sabah
In April 2014, he return to his former team Sabah, making a comeback after only spending six month with T-Team. In June 2019, he scored an important goal against Negeri Sembilan at Likas Stadium to ensure Sabah's position at the top of league. Sabah won the 2019 Malaysia Premier League and promoted to the 2020 Malaysia Super League. Alto retired from playing professionally at the end of 2022 season.

International career
Alto Linus was called up by K. Rajagopal for centralized training in a preparation for 2012 AFF Suzuki Cup. However he did not make any official appearances for the national team.

Coaching career
Alto begin his coaching career as assistant coach for Sabah F.C. in a match against PDRM at the 2023 Malaysia Super League.

Career statistics

Club

Honour

Club 
Sabah
 Malaysia Premier League (1): 2019

References

1986 births
Living people
Malaysian footballers
People from Sabah
Sabah F.C. (Malaysia) players
Association football midfielders
People from Keningau District